The New York State School Music Association (NYSSMA) is the New York affiliate of National Association for Music Education. NYSSMA is a professional organization that evaluates student musicians in New York state from elementary school to high school. Each spring, students register through their school music programs to attend NYSSMA Evaluation Festivals where they are adjudicated. These festivals take place at local middle and high schools, as well as state colleges and state universities within the fifteen NYSSMA zones, each of which covers an area in New York State. Usually, county high schools take turns to host the festival every few years.

At each festival, students perform scales, a solo or ensemble piece of their choice from the designated NYSSMA repertoire, and a sight reading piece. The judges score and comment on the students' performances according to defined guidelines set by NYSSMA. The grade sheets are then certified and sent to the music departments at the individual schools to be distributed to the students.

Instruments evaluated include voice, piano, strings, woodwinds/brasses, and percussion. NYSSMA scores and evaluators' comments are often used by music teachers as diagnostics and progress monitoring. They also determine selection into orchestra, band, or choral groups depending on their instrument. Students who play saxophones, brasses or percussion or sing can choose to be evaluated in NYSSMA Jazz Festival where they have an opportunity to be selected into various jazz ensembles. Performance groups include All-County, Area All-State (part of New York State), and Conference All-State (entire New York State).

Judgment Criteria
Participants in all categories prepare and perform a solo selected from the NYSSMA Manual, perform scales, and demonstrate sight reading from original music provided by NYSSMA at the audition. Each NYSSMA solo is preassigned a difficulty level from I (easiest) to VI (most difficult).  Instrumental soloists also must play scales, the number of which are determined by difficulty level of the solo. Overall each participant is judged on seven categories, tone, intonation, technique, accuracy, interpretation, scales, and sight reading.  Level I-IV solos are judged on a 28 point scale and level V-VI solos are judged on a 100 point scale.  Participants may also elect to receive a "festival" rating in which written comments are given but no score.

Vocalists (Levels I - IV) are judged on seven categories: 
Tone (Quality, Consistency, Projection) 
Intonation 
Technique (Breath Control, Flexibility, Posture, Appropriate Range) 
Diction (Vowels, Consonants, Naturalness) 
Accuracy (Accuracy of Notes, Accuracy of Rhythms, Steadiness of Rhythms, Pulse)
Interpretation (Dynamics, Style, Tempo, Phrasing, Expression, Artistry, Stage Presence) 
Sight reading (Accuracy of Dynamics, Accuracy of Notes, Accuracy of Rhythm, Correct tempo)

Woodwind/brass players are judged similarly, except "articulation" replaces "diction". String players are evaluated on their bowing techniques.

Levels and Grading System
There are a total of six levels, each with its own level of progressively more challenging repertoire. Levels I through IV are scored on a scale of 0 to 28, where each section is scored out of 4 points. Levels V and VI are scored from 0 to 100. Each of the judging categories are allotted a set points out of the total. For example, on Level V and VI String Solos, "Tone" is worth 20 points, "Intonation" 10, "Technique" 20, "Accuracy" 15, "Interpretation" 20, "Scales" 5, and "Sight reading" 10.

NYSSMA provides sight reading passages of all six levels from a proprietary manual. Scale requirement depends on level as well. Levels I and II require knowledge of three scales, III and IV require seven scales, and V and VI require all major scales. In levels I-IV, the performer can choose the scales they have prepared on the evaluation sheet. During the performance and evaluation, the judge would choose three scales at random among the expected set for the performer to play. In contrast, NYSSMA requires a list of rudiments that the soloist must prepare for their evaluation depending on the level of the solo for snare drum. Also, the soloist must perform a "long roll" for snare drum. For Levels I and II, the soloist must perform a long roll without speeding up and slowing down. However, in levels III, IV, V, and VI, the soloist must speed up to an orchestral roll (multiple bounce stroke roll) and slow back down to where they started.

Some students wish to forgo the numerical rating entirely in favor of a completely comment-based evaluation. Such students indicate this before the festival by checking the "Festival" box on the evaluation sheet. They need not perform all the required components of the evaluation if they wish, but the judge does not score the performance regardless. Therefore, for this option, the judge may only write comments.

References
NYSSMA

Organizations based in New York (state)
Music education organizations
Education-related professional associations
National Association for Music Education